Farid Uddin Masood (born 7 March 1950) is an Islamic scholar in Bangladesh known for his role as the Imam of Sholakia National Eidgah, Chairman of the National Religious Madrasa Education Board of Bangladesh, President of Bangladesh Jamiyatul Ulama, Director of Iqra Bangladesh, and former Director of Islamic Foundation Bangladesh. He has made significant contributions in various areas, such as serving as a key member of the Lajnatut Talaba for the expansion of Bengali Islamic literature. As the co-chair of the Bangladesh Qawmi Madrasa Education Commission, he played a pivotal role in obtaining recognition for the equivalency of Qawmi madrasa certificates. He is renowned for his Fatwa of Peace for Humanity against terrorism and suicide bombings, which has been endorsed by over 100,000 scholars. He has authored and translated more than a hundred books and serves as the editor-in-chief of the Monthly Patheo.

Early life 
Masood was born on 7 March 1950 in Hijlia in Pakundia Upazila of Kishoreganj district. His paternal residence was in Belanka under Tarail Upazila in the same district. His father, Abdur Rashid, was a teacher by profession and his mother was Sayeda Zebunnisa. In his personal life, he is the father of one daughter and three sons.

He completed his primary education under his father. Then he enrolled in Al Jamiatul Imdadiya, Kishoreganj. Later, with the aim of acquiring higher education, he went to Darul Uloom Deoband in India. In 1976, he obtained the first position and completed his studies in Hadith at Deoband. Among his teachers at Deoband were notable figures such as Sharif Hasan Deobandi, Muhammad Ali, and Muhammad Zakariyya al-Kandhlawi. He has received the permission for Baiat from Asad Madni.

Career 
After completing his Takmil fil Hadith from Al Jamiatul Imdadiya, Kishoreganj, in 1969 he began teaching there. When the Bangladesh Liberation War started, he actively participated in the war. After the independence, he started teaching at Jamia Islamia Darul Ulum Madania in Dhaka. Later, he moved to Darul Uloom Deoband and then joined  Jamia Arabia Imdadul Uloom Faridabad as a muhaddith. He taught at institutions like Jamia Shariyyah Malibagh and Jamia Madania Baridhara, and currently he is serving as Sheikhul Hadith at Jamia Iqra Bangladesh.

In 1977, he joined Islamic Foundation Bangladesh and served as a director. Afterwards, he was appointed as the chairman of the Islahul Muslimin and also served as the chairman of the Islamic Research Council Bangladesh.

Currently, he is the Imam of the Sholakia National Eidgah, the President of the National Religious Madrasa Education Board of Bangladesh and the Bangladesh Jamiyatul Ulama, the Director of Iqra Bangladesh, a special adviser to the The Asia Foundation, the Foundation for Global Policy Studies, the Islamic Research Council of Bangladesh, the Chairman of Iqra Multimedia Worldwide Limited, and the editor of the Monthly Patheo.

Literary works 
He started writing from his student life. Workers Rights in Islam is one of his notable books. In addition to writing for various national dailies such as The Azad and The Daily Ittefaq, he also wrote editorial pieces under the pseudonym Faran Rashidi in The Daily Ittefaq. He has a significant role as a cornerstone of the Bengali Islamic literature, as a member of the organization called Lajnatut Talaba, which demanded the expansion of the Bangla language. Qazi Mu'tasim Billah was the main inspiration for him. He has authored 31 books, including 12 translated works. Additionally, he started a Bengali Islamic magazine called Monthly Patheo.

Deobandism 
Masood is currently teaching Musalsal Hadith in Bangladesh. He has previously taught Musalsal Hadith at Al-Masjid an-Nabawi as well. He organized the first international Hadith conference in Bangladesh through his institution, Iqra Bangladesh Madrasa, which saw the participation of several Hadith scholars from Mecca, Syria, and Iraq. He has recently completed a Sirat spanning two thousand pages.

Madrasas 
As a proponent of the Deobandi movement, he actively promoted and spread its teachings in Bangladesh. To that end, he founded a madrasa called Jamiatul Islah Al-Madania in Ichhapur village, located in the Jaora Union of Thakurgaon. He arranges an annual four-day Islahi Ijtema on the grounds of the madrasa, drawing scholars, educators, and the general public from far and wide. Through this event, he motivates the public to pursue self-purification. In addition to this madrasa, he established Jamia Iqra Bangladesh in Rampura, Dhaka, of which his younger brother Arif Uddin Maruf is currently the chairman. He also established several other unorthodox religious schools under the banner of Iqra Bangladesh, which are overseen by his eldest son, Sadaruddin Maknoon.

Organisations 
He established an organization called Lajnatut Talaba, which became part of the Deobandi movement. He stated, "Lajnatut Talaba was not only a hub for Bengali Islamic discourse, but it was also an organization dedicated to promoting awareness of the Deobandi movement." In 2014, he founded Bangladesh Jamiyatul Ulama, and through this organization, he served as the co-chair of the Bangladesh Qawmi Madrasa Education Commission, aiming to gain recognition for Qawmi madrasas in Bangladesh. Additionally, he called for the provision of government salaries for imams in Bangladesh during a sukrana conference. He also urged Shah Ahmad Shafi, the former chairman of the Bangladesh Qawmi Madrasa Education Commission, to be honored with the Independence Award at the same event.

Government recognition of Qawmi madrasa 
Farid Uddin Masood played a pivotal role in the implementation of government recognition for Qawmi madrasas. In 2006, Islamic scholars gathered to demand recognition for Qawmi madrasas from former Prime Minister Khaleda Zia, but their efforts were unsuccessful. Later, under Sheikh Hasina's government, a committee was formed to focus on implementing recognition, with Shah Ahmad Shafi as the chairman and Farid Uddin Masood as the co-chairman. The government urged for unity among the Islamic scholars, leading to the formation of the committee. In 2017, Prime Minister Sheikh Hasina announced that the highest degree from Qawmi madrasas would be recognized as equivalent to a general Master's degree. Within a few days, the government issued a declaration of recognition.

Works for Peace

Interfaith Harmony 
Masood has actively participated in various seminars organized by the Bangladesh Inter-Religious Forum for Peace and Harmony, discussing different perspectives on mutual respect and global peace and security. He has also denounced attacks on religious institutions such as churches, pagodas, temples, and other places of worship throughout the country as being forbidden in Islam.

Fatwa against terrorism 
A fatwa has been issued by 100,000 Bangladeshi Islamic clerics forbidding terrorism and suicide bombings, which have been declared "haram" or forbidden under Islamic law. The fatwa comes in response to increasing concerns about extremist attacks in Bangladesh, including the July 2016 attack on a cafe in Dhaka, which killed 22 people. The Bangladesh Jamiyatul Ulama, one of the country's largest Islamic groups, endorsed the fatwa, and its leaders have called on the government to enforce it and take strong action against violators. The move is seen as a positive step in countering extremist ideology in Bangladesh.

Liberation war and war criminals

Contribution in Liberation war 
Farid Uddin Masood is a noteworthy figure among the freedom fighters of Bangladesh. He was actively involved in organizational work during the liberation war and consistently fought for independence. In an interview, he mentioned that he served as a teacher at Al Jamiatul Imdadiya, Kishoreganj during the war. Although he did not participate in any armed conflict, he worked towards unifying people for the cause of the liberation war. He provided assistance to freedom fighters and also carried out various organizational tasks. Throughout the war, he resided in Tarail, Kishoreganj. Essentially, he was motivated by his teachers to work towards the betterment of the country and subsequently joined the liberation war. One of his teachers, Qazi Mu'tasim Billah, was also a freedom fighter.

Works against war criminals 
In 2001, when the four-party alliance formed the government in Bangladesh, Motiur Rahman Nizami and Ali Ahsan Mohammad Mojaheed of the Bangladesh Jamaat-e-Islami were appointed as ministers. In protest, Masood voluntarily resigned from his position as director of the Islamic Foundation Bangladesh, citing his stance against enemies of Bangladesh's independence. In 2005, while traveling to the UK for an international peace conference, Masood was arrested at Hazrat Shahjalal International Airport in connection with a countrywide bombing campaign on August 17, 2005. After two days of remand, the investigating officer in the case granted him impunity from charges of involvement in the bombing campaign and referred to the accusation as "false, baseless, and fabricated" in the investigation report. The International Criminal Tribunal had accused Jamaat-e-Islami of war crimes, and in 2006, Masood began a political resistance movement against the party. Later, he joined the Sector Commanders' Forum in demanding the trial of war criminals and supported the Shahbag protests, which called for the trial of war criminals.

Public service 
He established a charitable organization named Islahul Muslimin Parishad that offers aid during natural disasters in various regions across the country. The organization carries out several social welfare programs, including distributing food aid to those affected by floods, providing medical treatment and supplies to the sick, and generating employment opportunities for the impoverished. Additionally, they launch campaigns advocating against dowry and organize dowry-free weddings in Itna of Kishoreganj, Tarail and Birganj of Dinajpur, Madhupur of Tangail, and Kanaighat of Sylhet. These events provide essential items such as wedding attire and equipment for orphaned and underprivileged grooms and brides, as well as vehicles, sewing machines, and goats for employment purposes. The organization also collaborates with the The Asia Foundation to conduct teacher training programs for madrasas and promote women's rights in various locations. Moreover, the Islahul Muslimin Parishad has provided relief supplies to Rohingya refugee camps and assistance to families affected by the COVID-19 pandemic throughout Bangladesh.

See also 
List of Deobandis

References

Further reading

External links 
An Interview in Imam.gov.bd

Farid Uddin Masood
Deobandis
1950 births
Hanafi fiqh scholars
Hanafis
Maturidis
Darul Uloom Deoband alumni
Bangladeshi Islamic religious leaders
20th-century Muslim scholars of Islam
Bangladeshi Sunni Muslim scholars of Islam
Living people
People from Kishoreganj District
20th-century Bengalis
21st-century Bengalis
Bengali Muslim scholars of Islam